Wood End is a village in Warwickshire, England.

Name
The official name of the village is Wood End. To avoid confusion with other Wood Ends' often referred to as "Wood End, Warwickshire", it is commonly referred to as Wood End, Stratford-upon-Avon to distinguish it from Wood End near Tamworth and Wood End near Fillongley.

Villages in Warwickshire
Tanworth-in-Arden